The glass of water theory is a doctrine affirming that in communist society the satisfaction of sexual desires and love will be as simple and unimportant as drinking a glass of water. The theory is commonly associated with Alexandra Kollontai, although such characterization ignores the complexity of her theoretical work. Anatoly Lunacharsky criticised the theory in his article "On Everyday Life: Young People and the 'Glass of Water' Theory". The place theory held in the Soviet ideological framework was replaced by 12 Sexual Commandments of the Revolutionary Proletariat by Aron Zalkind.

In 1926–1929, the theory was subjected to great criticism and persecution.

1929 is considered the year of the end of the Bolshevik sexual revolution and the theory of the glass of water as the basis of this revolution. However, a number of researchers in the history of the sexual revolution in the USSR argue that the sexual revolution formally ended in 1935 with the advent of a formal law criminalizing pornography.

References

External links
 

Sexuality in the Soviet Union
Philosophy of love
History of human sexuality